An FFT or fast Fourier transform is a numerical algorithm used in signal processing.

FFT may also refer to:

Games 
 Final Fantasy Tactics, a video game
 A Fistful of TOWs, a miniatures wargame
 Fédération Française de Tarot, the French tarot federation

Sport 
 Fédération Française de Tennis, the French Tennis Federation
 Firefighters Upsala CK, a Swedish cycling team
 Football Federation Tasmania, a football organisation in Australia
Four Four Two (4-4-2), a football formation
FourFourTwo, a football magazine
FourFourTwo (TV series), an Asian football TV series 
4-4-2, a band formed to record the song "Come on England" for the England football team for the Euro 2004 championship
 Tajikistan Football Federation

Science and technology
 2,1-fructan:2,1-fructan 1-fructosyltransferase
 Faculty of Food Technology, Latvia University of Agriculture
 Final-Form Text, part of IBM's Document Control Architecture
 Future Fibre Technologies, an Australian fibre optic company
 Faecal (or fecal) flotation test, a method used in veterinary parasitology to detect helminth eggs in faecal samples

United States aviation 
 Frontier Airlines
 Capital City Airport (Kentucky)

Other uses 
 Feiler faster thesis, in journalism
 Five Foot Thick, an American nu metal band

See also
 Finite Fourier transform (disambiguation)